Sir Thomas Hesilrige, 1st Baronet (1564 – 11 January 1629) was an English politician who sat in the House of Commons  in 1614 and 1624.

Hesilrige was the son of Thomas Hesilrige of Noseley Hall,  Noseley, Leicestershire and his wife Ursula Andrews daughter of Sir Thomas Andrews of Charwelton, Northamptonshire and his wife Catherine Cave.

He was High Sheriff of Leicestershire in 1613. In 1614, Hesilrige was elected Member of Parliament for Leicestershire in the Addled Parliament. He was created baronet on 21 July 1622. He was re-elected MP for Leicestershire in 1624.

Hesilrige married Frances Gorges, daughter of Sir William Gorges of Alderton, Northamptonshire and had eight sons and five daughters. He was succeeded in the baronetcy by his son Arthur who was one of the Five Members Charles I tried to arrest at the House of Commons in 1642.

References

 

1564 births
1629 deaths
Baronets in the Baronetage of England
Thomas
High Sheriffs of Leicestershire
Members of the Parliament of England for Leicestershire
English MPs 1614
English MPs 1624–1625